Ranaghat is a city and a municipality in Nadia district in the state of West Bengal, India. It is the headquarters of the Ranaghat subdivision. It is compact but one of the densely populated cities of West Bengal. It is known for its handloom industry, various types of flowers and floriculture and a flower market.

History 
After independence Ranaghat was chosen to be the district capital but later Krishnanagar city was selected instead.

Ranaghat has existed since the British invaded India. The most likely origin for the name of the town comes from Rani (Queen) or Rana (a Rajput warrior) and Ghat (steps leading to the river). A myth is still prevalent that the name of the town came from the bandit 'Rana Dacoit', who used to pillage this area five or six hundred years back and he used to give pujas to the goddess Kali to thank her.

A large percentage of the population are the families of Hindu refugees from Bangladesh, who fled during the Bangladesh Liberation War in 1971 with Pakistan. There are also many families who had extensive ties to foreign investments in the town. Ranaghat also played an important role in the struggle of freedom of India.

This is the home town of some notable Bengali people. Film actress Raakhee Gulzar was born and brought up in a refugee colony in Ranaghat. Athlete and olympian Soma Biswas is from Ranaghat. Poet Joy Goswami born and brought up in the town near Chotobazar area. 
Krishna Panti was known as one of the "5 Great Noblemen of Bengal." He and his descendants the Pal-Chaudhuri family donated land and built many of the town's temples and cultural institutions, including the Happy Club and Pal-Chaudhuri school, and many of the streets of the town are named after them. Born in a mud hut, Krishna Panti rose to become one of the greatest merchants of Bengal, and a great philanthropist. He was given the title Pal-Chaudhuri and became Zamindar over a huge area of Nadia. Employing Scottish architects, he built palatial buildings, temples and gardens, which are some of the only such buildings in the region to remain mostly intact.

Geography

Location
The town is exactly 74 kilometres north of Calcutta and 26 kilometres south of Krishnanagar, Nadia District headquarter. It is on the banks of River Churni.

Note: The map alongside presents some of the notable locations in the subdivision. All places marked in the map are linked in the larger full screen map. All the four subdivisions are presented with maps on the same scale – the size of the maps vary as per the area of the subdivision.

Police station
Ranaghat and Taherpur police stations have jurisdiction over Ranaghat, Birnagar, Taherpur and Ranaghat I CD Block. The total area covered by the Ranaghat police station is 250 km2 and the population covered was 624,151 in 2001.

Demographics

 India census, Ranaghat had a population of 68,754. Males constitute 51% of the population and females 49%. Ranaghat had an average literacy rate of 84%, higher than the national average of 59.5%: male literacy was 87%, and female literacy was 80%. In Ranaghat, 8% of the population was under 6 years old.

In the 2011 census, Ranaghat Urban Agglomeration had a population of 235,583, out of which 119,578 were male and 116,005 were female. The 0–6 years population was 18,575. Effective literacy rate for the 7+ population was 86.10%. Male literacy was 89.77% and female literacy at 82.33%

The following municipalities, notified area, outgrowths and census towns were part of Ranaghat Urban Agglomeration in 2011 census: Ranaghat (M), Birnagar (M), Cooper's Camp (NA), Magurkhali (OG), Ranaghat (CT) (CT), Hijuli (CT), Aistala (CT), Satigachha (CT), Nasra (CT), Panpara (CT), Raghabpur (CT), Kamgachhi (CT), Anulia (CT) and Halalpur Krishnapur (CT).

Economy 

Ranaghat is an important place of business. Small traders from nearby towns and villages purchase goods from Ranaghat Town Bazar. Both wholesale and retail business have developed here.
The economy of Ranaghat and its surrounding region is mostly based on agriculture. Paddy (rice), flour, wheat and fruits are produced by farmers outside the main township. Various dairy products are transported to Kolkata every morning. A cold storage had been renovated by former chief minister Buddhadeb Bhattacharya at Nokari village, located on east half of the town.

"The Department of Food Processing Industries of India was planning to set up a market complex exclusively for florists in Ranaghat." Ranaghat has one of the capturing market of flowers in West Bengal.

Another industry which receives immense government patronage is handicraft and boutiques. At least 1000 people depend on this for their livelihood. Aishtala (situated on the west bank of river Churni) is a place for textile weaving. Moreover, ready-made garments are trendy clothes of late became very popular among the teens and youths.

Education 

The town has a large number of primary and high-schools and a college for higher education.

High schools
 Convent of Jesus and Mary, Ranaghat
 Brajabala Girls' High School
 Pal Choudhury High School
 Lalgopal High School (HS)

Colleges
 Ranaghat College
 Ranaghat Government Polytechnic

Culture

Festivals 

The town is inhabited mostly by Bengali Hindus. Durga-puja and Kali puja, like in all other Bengali communities, are the largest and most colourful festivals and are celebrated throughout the town.

A Hindu festival called 'Dol yatra' is celebrated everywhere at the town. A village named 'Harinagar' is known for 'kirtan', a gathering of Hindu religious people in a motive to know God Krishna, is very popular.

History of the ancient rath yatra of Ranaghat: The history of Palchowdhury and De Chowdhury is closely associated with the Rath Yatra of the ancient city of Ranaghat. The 3 ancient chariots of Ranaghat are in the hands of this dynasty.Two different dynasties of the Pal Chowdhury ratha yatra in different ways.One is Krishnapanti and the other is Shambhupanti. It is known from history that Krishnapanti and Shambhupanti bought the village of Ranaghat on the banks of the river Churni at auction. Today's Ranaghat town is made up of different lands donated by them.

Muslim community also present in court para.People from all ethnic group/religious group live together in a peaceful way and that is the beauty of this city. The Christian community celebrates Christmas at Begopara Church outside the main township. During Christmas, people from all religions join the party. Moreover, there is a mosque at Nasra-para, on the outskirts of the town. Here people celebrate Eid, Durga Puja, Diwali , Christmas Day together. It is a cultured place.

Sports
Cricket and football are the most popular sports. Karate has been a great interest amongst the youth of Ranaghat since the 1980s. Since then many boys and girls have excelled in this field and brought laurels for Ranaghat even from national and international arena.

Transportation

Railways

 is one of the most important railway junctions in the Sealdah–Lalgola railway section. The "Maitree Express" linking Kolkata and Dhaka passes through Ranaghat.

The city is well connected to the Sealdah railway station through the Sealdah–Ranaghat line. Local and passenger trains are available frequently.

The railway station at Ranaghat has a long history. The Sealdah–Ranaghat rail connection was made during the British period. This main line was opened in September 1862. Ranaghat–Kalyani and Ranaghat–Shantipur sections were electrified in the financial year 1963–64.

From Ranaghat railway station, trains travel both north and south. Local trains are available to: , Shantipur, Gede, Bangaon, Baharampur and Sealdah. Couple of ladies-special trains were inaugurated in the year 2010.

Railway ministry of India are taking steps to make Ranaghat Railway station as a station of national importance. Numerous plans have been considered for the modernization and improvement of the platforms and the surrounding areas.

Roadways

The town has three bus-stands, one at Rathtala, one near Ranaghat College and one over GNPC Road opposite police phari. CSTC buses plying from Kolkata going to North Bengal also has a stop at Ranaghat on NH-34. Buses ply to Krishnanagar, Hanskhali, Aishmali, Palassey, Bethua and other parts of Nadia district. Long-distance night buses to north Bengal are also available. People in general, though prefer trains because of ready availability and more convenience.

SH 11 meets NH 12 at Ranaghat.

Auto rickshaw service might be popular in other cities of West Bengal but it is available here.  There are very few private cars.

Airways
Nearest airport from the town being the Netaji Subhash Chandra Bose International Airport at Dum Dum, almost 65 km from the town.

Notable people 
 Joy Goswami, poet of Bengali literature
 Mausumi Dikpati, scientist at the High Altitude Observatory operated by the National Center for Atmospheric Research, USA

 Indrani Pal-Chaudhuri, ancestral place for this Indian-Canadian-British director and photographer
 Rakhee Gulzar, film actress
 Prabhat Kumar Mukhopadhyaya, a Bengali author best known for his biography of Rabindranath Tagore
 Soma Biswas, An internationally recognized athlete
Susmita Bose, Indian-American scientist, Herbert and Brita Lindholm endowed Chair Professor, Washington State University
 Indranil Biswas, India-American Microbiologist. Fulbright Scholar.

References

External links 

 Ranaghat on Google Maps
 Ranaghat Sub Division Official HomePage

Cities and towns in Nadia district
Cities in West Bengal